Rougerie is a French surname. Notable people with the surname include:

Aurélien Rougerie (born 1980), French rugby union player
Jacques Rougerie, French rugby union player
Jacques Rougerie (architect) (born 1945), French architect and underwater habitat designer
Michel Rougerie (1950–1981), French motorcycle racer

French-language surnames